Nekropolis 2 is the third studio album by Nekropolis, released in 1982 by Hasch Platten.

Track listing

Personnel
Adapted from the Nekropolis 2 liner notes.
 Peter Frohmader – electronics, guitar, eight-string bass guitar, Rhodes piano, vibraphone, drum machine, gong, percussion, production, cover art

Release history

References

External links 
 

1982 albums
Nekropolis albums